Cracovia is the Latin name for the Polish city of Kraków (Cracow). It may refer to:

 Cracovia SC, a football club in Australia
 Cracovia (vodka), brand of Polish vodka
 KS Cracovia (disambiguation), a list of teams in the KS Cracovia sports club

See also